Yordan Hristov (Bulgarian: Йордан Христов; born 12 February 1984) is a Bulgarian footballer who plays as a defender.

Career

Early career
Hristov started to play football in FC Plovdiv 95 in his home town Plovdiv. His first coaches were Stefan Tahchiev and Petar Dafchev and in 1999 the team won the silver medals in the National Children Football League in Sofia. Then in 2002 he joined Maritsa Plovdiv and had an important role there from 2005 to 2007. In 2007 his former coach brought him to Spartak Plovdiv and after some strong performances he became captain of the team.

Botev Plovdiv

2011-12 season
After Spartak voluntarily relegated in Bulgaria's third division in 2011 he signed with Botev Plovdiv and became momentous part of the team scoring the crucial goals in the 1/16 final and 1/8 final cup matches against Botev Vratsa and Chernomorets Burgas. During this season Hristov played as a midfielder.

2012-13
Hristov was among the few player which were not released by the club after the promotion to A Grupa. The new manager of Botev Plovdiv Ferario Spasov changed his position and started using him as a right-back. Yordan made a debut in A Grupa on 26 August 2012 during the 2-0 win against Chernomorets Burgas. He initially became substitute for Stefan Stanchev but gradually established himself as a regular member of the starting lineup.

2013-14
During season 2013-14 Stanimir Stoilov used Hristov only as a right-back. His good performance in Europa League and A Grupa caught the attention of the Bulgaria head coach Lyuboslav Penev and he earned his first caps for Bulgaria National Football Team.

2014-15
Yordan Hristov was among the few players who accepted a pay cut and remained at the club despite the financial crisis. Botev Plovdiv hired Velislav Vutsov as a new manager. He made Hristov a vice-captain and asked him to play several different roles as a defender or midfielder depending on the tactics of the rival teams. As a key played Hristov participated in all official games and did not miss even a minute during the matches July, August and September.

On 7 December, Hristov made an assist for the second goal scored by Lachezar Baltanov during the 2-0 win over PFC Haskovo.

2015-16
Yordan Hristov was selected as the new captain of Botev Plovdiv after the retirement of Ivan Tsvetkov. He played on his regular position as a right-back during the 1-1 draw with Levski Sofia in the first round of A Grupa. On 25 July he was sent off during the shocking defeat from PFC Montana.

On 17 October 2015 Hristov scored magnificent goal against the local rivals from Lokomotiv Plovdiv but it was not enough and Botev Plovdiv was defeated with 2-1.

On 12 April 2016 Bulgarian newspaper accused Hristov for organizing a coup against the manager Nikolay Kostov. Later that day both of them officially declined to have any problems in their professional relationship on the website of the club.

The contact of Yordan Hristov was not renewed and he left the team after the end of season 2015-16.

Maritsa Plovdiv
In December 2017, Hristov returned to his hometown club Maritsa Plovdiv.  He left the club at the end of the 2017–18 season following the relegation to Third League.

International career
After some impressing performances during the 2012-2013 season Bulgaria head coach Lyuboslav Penev called Hristov for the friendly  games against Japan and Kazakhstan on 30 May and 5 June 2013. He made his debut on 30 May against Japan when he came as a substitution for Stanislav Manolev in the 79th minute.

Honours

Botev Plovdiv
 Bulgarian Cup Runner-up: 2014
 Bulgarian Supercup Runner-up: 2014

Career statistics

Club
As of 27 May 2013

References

External links

1984 births
Living people
Footballers from Plovdiv
Bulgarian footballers
Bulgaria international footballers
Association football midfielders
Association football defenders
FC Maritsa Plovdiv players
FC Spartak Plovdiv players
Botev Plovdiv players
Ermis Aradippou FC players
First Professional Football League (Bulgaria) players
Second Professional Football League (Bulgaria) players
Cypriot First Division players
Bulgarian expatriate footballers
Bulgarian expatriate sportspeople in Cyprus
Expatriate footballers in Cyprus